Babare is a village (previously: VDC) in Kalinchowk Rural Municipality in Dolakha District in the Bagmati Province of north-eastern Nepal. At the time of the 1991 Nepal census it had a population of 3,392 people living in 739 individual households.

This village is now a ward (ward no. 2) of Kalinchowk Rural Municipality. It has  of area and total population according to 2011 Nepal census is 3,533 Individuals.

References

External links
UN map of the municipalities of Dolakha District

Populated places in Dolakha District